All Women Are Bitches is a single by the Toronto band Fifth Column.

The lyrics were written by Caroline Azar and G.B. Jones and the music was composed by Fifth Column. It was produced by Walter Sobczak at Wellesley Sound Studios in Toronto, Ontario, Canada.

The song first appeared as a single released by K Records in 1992. It was the 33rd single in the K Records 'International Pop Underground ' series. It was reviewed for the UK music publication Melody Maker by Everett True and voted 'Single of the Week'. The song was also on the Fifth Column album, 36-C, released by K Records in 1994. As well, it was included on the 1993 K Records compilation, International Hip Swing.

"All Women Are Bitches",  has been 'covered' and re-imagined by Lesbians on Ecstasy as "Bitchsy" in 2004, appearing on their first self-titled album. In 2005, "Bitchsy" was featured on the TV series Queer as Folk. "Bitchsy" and "All Women Are Bitches" were remixed and sampled together by Kids on TV in 2005, and appeared on the Lesbians on Ecstasy remix album, Giggles in the Dark.

Personnel
Caroline Azar        -vocals
Beverly Breckenridge -bass
G.B. Jones           -guitar
Chaz Salmon              -guitar
Joel Wasson              -drums
Background vocals        -Caroline Azar, Beverly Breckenridge, Jena von Brücker, G.B. Jones

References

External links
"All Women Are Bitches" featured on Jeff Roy's Singles Club

1992 singles
Fifth Column (band) songs
1992 songs